Sir David Kenneth Rowe-Ham, GBE (19 December 1935 – 21 July 2020) was a British chartered accountant. Rowe-Ham was educated at Dragon School and Charterhouse School.

He was Lord Mayor of London from 1986 to 1987. During his tenure, he initiated the Lord Mayor's Dragon Awards, awarded for community engagement.

References 

 Who Was Who

1935 births
2020 deaths
British accountants
20th-century lord mayors of London
Knights Grand Cross of the Order of the British Empire